Templin is a small town in Germany.

Templin may refer to:

 Templin Hall, a residence hall at the University of Kansas
 Templin, Queensland, a locality that features a historical museum in Queensland, Australia
 Templin Highway, a two-lane road in the United States
 Treaty of Templin, a treaty signed in 1317 ending a war between the Margraviate of Brandenburg and Denmark

People named Templin
 Jean Templin (born 1928), former French football player
 Lutz Templin (1901–1973), German jazz bandleader
 Templin Potts (1855–1927), 11th Naval Governor of Guam